Chickasawhatchee is an unincorporated community in Terrell County, in the U.S. state of Georgia.

History
The community took its name from Chickasawhatchee Creek. Variant names were "Chickasawhachee", "Chickasawhatchie", and "Hortonville". The Georgia General Assembly incorporated the place as the "Town of Chickawawhatchee" in 1856. The town's municipal charter was officially repealed in 1995.

References

Former municipalities in Georgia (U.S. state)
Unincorporated communities in Terrell County, Georgia
Unincorporated communities in Georgia (U.S. state)
Populated places disestablished in 1995